The Pawnee Agency Office and Superintendent's House are two of several buildings located in the 29-acre Boarding School Historic District in Pawnee, Oklahoma.  Both were awarded National Historic Place status in 1973. The surrounding district was awarded National Historic Place status in 2000.

The Superintendent's house is the oldest structure in the Historic District, built in 1876.  It was the original office and residence of the Indian Agent. At the turn of the century this individual became the superintendent of the school in the Historic District.

References

Buildings and structures in Pawnee County, Oklahoma
Pawnee, Oklahoma
Government buildings on the National Register of Historic Places in Oklahoma
National Register of Historic Places in Pawnee County, Oklahoma